The minister of state for the Middle East, North Africa, South Asia and United Nations is a mid-level position in the Foreign, Commonwealth and Development Office in the British government. It is currently held by Tariq Ahmad, who took the office on 13 June 2017.

History 
The office was previously held by Sayeeda Warsi, Baroness Warsi when it was styled as Senior Minister of State for Foreign and Commonwealth Affairs and Joyce Anelay, Baroness Anelay of St Johns when it was styled as Minister of State for South Asia and the Commonwealth.

Responsibilities 
The minister has the following ministerial responsibilities:

India and Indian Ocean (including UK India Roundtable)
Afghanistan, Pakistan and Central Asia 
North Africa
Multilateral engagement (including United Nations and G7), sanctions and strategic engagement
The Commonwealth
Open societies (including Westminster Foundation for Democracy) 
Independent Commission for Aid Impact (ICAI)
Humanitarian issues
Protocol

List

References 

Foreign, Commonwealth and Development Office
Lists of government ministers of the United Kingdom
Foreign ministers of the United Kingdom